Falkenbergs IP is a football stadium in Falkenberg, and the former home arena for Falkenbergs FF. Falkenbergs IP has a total capacity of 5,500 spectators.

Football venues in Sweden
Falkenbergs FF